The Shrimp is a children's novel by Emily Smith. It won the 2001 Gold Award in 6–8 years category of the Nestlé Smarties Book Prize. It is a part of the Young Corgi series.

Characters
Ben Shrimpton: Ben is a shy boy who likes to collect shells. Because of his height and shyness, his friends like to call him "Shrimp".
Colin: Colin is a spoiled boy in a rich family who likes to boast about how rich his family is. He doesn't like Ben and was the first person who started calling Ben "Shrimp".

British children's novels
2001 British novels
2001 children's books
Corgi books